Geevarghese Mar Dionysius of Vattasseril popularly known as Vattasseril Thirumeni (31 October 1858 – 23 February 1934) was a bishop of the Malankara Church, 15th Malankara Metropolitan, and a founder of the Malankara Orthodox Syrian Church. In 2003, the Church declared Mar Dionysius as a saint. He is known as 'The Great Luminary of Malankara Church' (Malayalam: Malankara Sabha Bhasuran), a title which the Church bestowed on him in recognition of his contribution to the Church.

Early life and education
Geevarghese was born in Vattasseril family, the fifth child of Joseph Vattasseril of Mallappally and Aleyamma, Kolathu Kalathil of Kurichy, on 31 October 1858. Among his siblings, Ouseph Punnoose was also a priest. Following his elementary education at C. M. S. Middle School in Mallappally he completed his high school education from C. M. S. High School, Kottayam. On 12 October 1876, while still a high school student, he was ordained as a sub-deacon by Patriarch of Antioch Ignatius Peter III at Puthuppally St. George Church.

Life in the Church
He studied at the Orthodox Theological Seminary (Old Seminary or Pazhaya Seminary), Kottayam for four years. He acted as the secretary to Gregorios Geevarghese of Parumala. Geevarghese soon became a great Syriac scholar under the careful tutelage of St. Gregorios, who taught him at Parumala Seminary. He also learned Theology and Syriac language from Metropolitan Baselios Paulose I at Monastery of Saint Thomas, Vettikkal. On 16 October 1879, the sub-deacon Geevarghese was ordained as a full deacon and on 18 January 1880 he was ordained to priesthood by St. Gregorios himself. For some time, Fr. Geevarghese oversaw the theological education at Parumala Seminary. As per the existing tradition, he had been ordained for Parumala Seminary. During the period 1881–1908 he was the manager of the Seminary. In 1895, Fr. Geevarghese accompanied St. Gregorios on his visit to the Holy Land along with Paulose Ramban.

Malankara Malpan
By 1880, Rev. Fr. Geevarghese had become an authority in the Syriac language, Canons of the Church, Church History, Faith and Doctrine, the Church Fathers, Patristics and Theology.  In recognition of his expertise in Syriac and theology he was designated as Malankara Malpaan (a Doctor and Teacher of the Church). In 1887, he was appointed the Syriac teacher at the Old Seminary. Malpan Fr. Geevarghese spent his spare time reading, studying, and thinking which translated to his many writings, such as the book Doctrines of the Church.  He also used his scholarship to edit and publish the order of Church worship to be used by the laity as an aid for participation in worship.  He wrote and published a book titled Syriac - Chapter I for students of the language. During this period, he also authored the book Doctrines of the Church(Mathopadeshasarangal) which remains one of the most authoritative and popular works describing Orthodox dogma and ecclesiastical traditions with thorough Scriptural explanations. In 1903, he translated the Holy Service book from Syriac to the local language Malayalam and published it with the blessings of the Church authorities.

Principal of M. D. Seminary School
In 1896, by the decision of Managing Committee of the Church, he was appointed as Principal of M. D. Seminary School, Kottayam. He served as the Principal for eight years, while teaching at the Old Seminary at the same time. His colleagues at the Seminary include the eminent Syriac scholar Rev. Fr. Mathen Malpan of Konat.

Bishopric
The Malankara Association meeting which convened at Parumala Seminary on 2 December 1902 nominated Fr. Geevarghese and Kochuparampil Paulose Ramban (Later Malankara Metropolitan of Jacobite Syrian Church)to the office of Metropolitan Bishop. On 2 November 1903 (the first Feast day of St. Gregorios), Fr. Geevarghese Malpan was blessed as a Ramban (monk) at Parumala Seminary by Dionysius V (Pulikkottil Joseph Dionysius II). Following this, he moved to the Old Seminary. The Malankara Association meeting of 14 February 1908 officially elected him along with Kochuparampil Paulose Ramban for consecration as Metropolitan. In the same year, the Patriarch of Antioch Ignatius Abded Aloho II asked the two elected monks to reach Jerusalem during the Great Lent for the ordination. The two-week-long journey began on 13 April 1908. The party which also included Kallasseril Punnoose Ramban (later Catholicos Geevarghese II), Karottuveetil Fr. Yuyakkim (later Metropolitan Yuyakkim Ivanios) and Dn. Mathews Paret (later Mathews Ivanios) arrived at Jerusalem on 23 April (Holy Saturday). After some delay, the Patriarch Ignatius Abded Aloho II arrived from Turkey. On 31 May 1908, the ordination took place at Sehion House (where Jesus had the Last Supper). Fr. Geevarghese was enthroned as Geevarghese Dionysius Metropolitan by the patriarch, but denied a sthathicon certifying him due to his denial of  the patriarch's temporal authority over the Malankara Church. The ceremony was attended by representatives of Coptic and Greek Orthodox Churches. Dionysius was appointed as the Bishop of the Malankara Church in general and as the assistant to the Malankara Metropolitan Dionysius V The newly ordained bishop served as the Assistant Malankara Metropolitan for almost a year.

Malankara Metropolitan
On 26 November 1911, the Malankara Association convened at the Old Seminary and elected Geevarghese Dionysius as the successor to Malankara Metropolitan Dionysius V. The next year he assumed full office of Malankara Metropolitan following the demise of Dionysius V and served and led the Church in that capacity until his death in 1934 when he and the Church triumphed in establishing the official constitution of the Malankara Orthodox Syrian Church.

Rift of the Malankara Syrian Church
By the early 1910s, there was a rift in the Malankara Church and the two factions emerged, with the Metropolitan faction (Later as Malankara Orthodox Church) remaining in support and under the Malankara Metropolitan Dionysius of Vattasseril, while the faction supporting the Patriarch (known as Patriarch faction) elected a new Malankara Metropolitan Coorilos Paulose of Panampady under the Patriarch of the Antioch.

Legacy

He was an outstanding orator who was well aware of the importance of the vitality and Christian persuasiveness of the Bible when delivering the speeches to the faithful. Prayers and fasting were the pillars of his spiritual foundation. In addition to the liturgical hours of prayer, he spent much time in private prayers and silent meditations behind closed doors.  In spite of his busy schedule, he was also able to focus on three to four lessons from the Holy Bible every day.  Despite of the many spiritual qualities he shared leadership qualities like domineering charisma and progressive mindedness. The church recognizes him as a living saint of his time on earth.

Mar Dionysius VI and his fellow clergies have played a central role in elevating the primate of Malankara Orthodox Church to the title Catholicos of the East. By establishing the Catholicate in Malabar, the visionary Metropolitan succeeded in defending the sovereignty and independence of the St. Thomas Christians of India. Mar Dionysius VI also prepared a first draft of the Church Constitution with the aid of Patriarch Ignatius Abdul Masih II and of using his profound knowledge in the Canons of the Church. This draft was used to prepare the Church Constitution of 1934. In his last encyclical, he wrote to the entire Malankara Church: 

Being a great guide and example of Christian monasticism, the legacy of Dionysius survived through his successors as well as students including Catholicos of the East Baselios Geevarghese II and the saintly Metropolitan Kuriakose Gregorios of Pampady. He always kept an ardent position in his upbringings in faith, like Mary of Bethany(Luke 10:42) he took from it what was good for his people and administration.

Death
Dionysius VI experienced physical suffering on 13 February 1934, and suffered from paralysis on 16 February. Still, the Metropolitan had clear memory. On 21 February, Baselios Geevarghese II administered him the service of Anointing. Two days later, Dionysius VI died on 23 February 1934, and was buried the next day in the Chapel of Old Seminary, Kottayam, near the tombs of his predecessors.

In his speech that day, Baselios Geevarghese II said:

Canonization
Dionysius VI was exalted as a saint and confessor to the faithful. On the 69th feast day of Dionysius VI (24 February 2003), he was canonized by the Episcopal Synod of Malankara Orthodox Church headed by Baselios MarThoma Mathews II, Malankara Metropolitan and Catholicos of the Malankara Church. St. Dionysius is the second Indian Saint to be canonized by the Malankara Orthodox Syrian Church. The Catholicos Baselios Geevarghese II might have foreseen this when he instructed the sentence "The time will not dim his glory" to be engraved on the tomb of Dionysius VI. 23 February is observed as the saint's feast day.

Churches, monasteries and orphanages
Honoring the Saint's memory, several churches and educational institutions have been established including St. Dionysius Church, Perukavu (Trivandrum), St. Dionysius Church in Al Ain, United Arab Emirates, St. dionysius orthodox church Desertland, Dammam (under diocese of Thrissur), St. Dionysius Indian Orthodox Church, Auckland, New Zealand, St. Dionysius Orthodox Church, Dasarahalli, Bangalore, St. Dionysius Orthodox Chapel, Aravali (Gurugram) and Dionysius Senior Secondary School in Mallappally, Kerala, to name a few. M. G. D. Ashram (monastery) at Panayampala, Kerala was founded in 1980 with St. Dionysius as its Patron Saint. The Ashram has an orphanage (Balabhavan) in its care since 2000.

Further reading

See also
 Malankara Orthodox Syrian Church
 Mar Thoma I
 Mar Thoma II
 Mar Thoma III
 Mar Thoma IV
 Mar Thoma V
 Mar Thoma VI (Dionysius I)
 Mar Thoma VII
 Mar Thoma VIII
 Mar Thoma IX
 Dionysius II
 Dionysius III
 Dionysius IV
 Athanasius
 Dionysius V
 Baselios Geevarghese II

References

External links
 Saint Dionysius of Vattasseril

1858 births
1934 deaths
People from Pathanamthitta district
Malankara Orthodox Syrian Church saints
Indian Christian saints
Malankara Orthodox Syrian Church bishops
20th-century Christian saints
20th-century Oriental Orthodox bishops